Bellefonte Township is one of 20 current townships in Boone County, Arkansas, USA. As of the 2010 census, its total population was 2,380.

Geography

Cities, towns, and villages
Bellefonte
Harrison (part)

Population history
Figures include the population of the town of Bellefonte and in recent decades a part of the city of Harrison.

References
 United States Census Bureau 2008 TIGER/Line Shapefiles
 United States Board on Geographic Names (GNIS)
 United States National Atlas

 Census 2010 U.S. Gazetteer Files: County Subdivisions in Arkansas

External links
 US-Counties.com
 City-Data.com

Townships in Boone County, Arkansas
Townships in Arkansas